Ian Jenkins may refer to:

Ian Jenkins (curator) (1953–2020), curator at the British Museum
Ian Jenkins (figure skater) (born 1962), British figure skater
Ian Jenkins (politician) (born 1941), Scottish politician
Ian Jenkins (Royal Navy officer) (1944–2009), former Surgeon General of the British Armed Forces
Iain Jenkins (born 1972), former Northern Ireland footballer